Zdzisław Mrożewski (21 May 1909 – 5 July 2002) was a Polish actor. He appeared in 30 films between 1932 and 1981. He starred in the 1977 film Death of a President, which was entered into the 28th Berlin International Film Festival, where it won the Silver Bear for an outstanding artistic contribution.

Partial filmography

 Ulani, ulani, chlopcy malowani (1932)
 Warsaw Premiere (1951) - Count Alfred
 Niedaleko Warszawy (1954) - Engineer Antoni Przewlocki
 Podhale w ogniu (1956) - Gadra
 Farewells (1958) - Pawel's Father
 Rok pierwszy (1960) - dziedzic Woloka
 Rzeczywistosc (1961)
 Dzis w nocy umrze miasto (1961) - Professor
 Swiadectwo urodzenia (1961) - Doctor Orzechowski (segment "Kropla krwi")
 Drugi czlowiek (1961)
 Glos z tamtego swiata (1962) - Professor Choberski, Urszula's Father
 Pevnost na Rýne (1962) - General Gordon
 Glos ma prokurator (1965)
 Westerplatte (1967) - Lt. Col. Wincenty Sobocinski
 Czerwone i zlote (1969) - Jan Nepomucen Pozarski
 Epilog norymberski (1971) - David Maxwell Fife
 Dzieciol (1971) - Tylski
 Boleslaw Smialy (1972) - Kanclerz Radosz
 The Story of Sin (1975) - Mr. Pobratynski
 Nights and Days (1975) - Leon Woynarowski
 Zofia (1976) - Wladyslaw
 Death of a President (1977) - Gabriel Narutowicz
 Sprawa Gorgonowej (1977) - Gasiorowski
 Granica (1978) - Mr. Ziembiewicz
 Mephisto (1981) - Bruckner, tanácsos
 Polonia Restituta (1981) - Arthur Balfour

References

External links

1909 births
2002 deaths
Polish male film actors
20th-century Polish male actors